The 2009 UCI BMX World Championships took place at the Adelaide Showgrounds in Adelaide in Australia and crowned world champions in the cycling discipline of BMX.

Medal summary

External links

Union Cycliste Internationale website

UCI BMX World Championships
UCI BMX World Championships
International cycle races hosted by Australia
Uci Bmx World Championships, 2009